The Drinkmore Cafe is a coffee shop on Capitol Hill in Seattle, Washington.

History 
Opened on April 1, 2000, as the Bit Star, it was reported by InfoWorld to be the first commercial business to offer free wireless internet Wi-Fi services. Although few had the equipment necessary to take advantage of this, free wireless internet became a major component of the small coffee shop business model across America. Owned and run by software executive and Seattle mayoral candidate Scott Kennedy, The Drinkmore was the headquarters of Seattle Wireless and was the Howard Dean meetup spot during his 2004 presidential campaign.

The original location, a 1905 warehouse at the corner of Bellevue Avenue East and Thomas Street, was demolished by the property owner to make way for new condominiums.

References

External links

1998 establishments in Washington (state)
Coffee in Seattle
Coffeehouses and cafés in the United States
Restaurants established in 1998
Restaurants in Seattle